On November 16, 2006, France, Italy and Spain announced a new Middle East peace plan proposed by Spanish Premier José Luis Rodríguez Zapatero during talks with French president Jacques Chirac. Later on, the plan was introduced to Romano Prodi, Italy's prime minister who gave his full support to the plan. The peace move came after Israel invaded the Gaza Strip in Operation Autumn Clouds.

Plan
The plan is a five-point blueprint for peace between the Israelis and Palestinians. The plan calls for:

 an immediate ceasefire, 
 an exchange of prisoners, 
 an international peace conference (similar to the Madrid Conference of 1991, which was held by Spain and led to the Oslo Accords), while it also 
 backs a prospective Palestinian unity government, and 
 an international mission in the Gaza Strip to monitor the ceasefire.

Reaction
Senior Palestinian National Authority negotiator Saeb Erekat welcomed the plan in principle, but added that there was no need for a new initiative, but rather that it could serve as a realistic political track to a two-state solution. An Israeli official said parts of the plan were being discussed, but that it was not being taken seriously as it was not coordinated with the EU or Israel. Israel supports direct negotiations over an international conference.

See also
Gaza–Israel conflict
List of Middle East peace proposals

References

 
 

Franco-Italian-Spanish Middle East Peace Plan, 2006
Franco-Italian-Spanish Middle East Peace Plan, 2006
Franco-Italian-Spanish Middle East Peace Plan, 2006
Israeli–Palestinian peace process
Peace treaties
Proposed treaties
France–Italy relations
Italy–Spain relations
France–Spain relations
France–Israel relations
France–State of Palestine relations
Israel–Italy relations
Israel–Spain relations